The Commonwealth Bank Officers' Association was an Australian trade union, comprising staff of the Commonwealth Bank of Australia. It was established in 1930 and continued until 1993 when combined with another sector union to form the Finance Sector Union in a wider process of union amalgamation in Australia at that time.

In its middle years, at the end of World War II, the CBOA encountered tension in leadership as was also happening at the same time in the Federated Ironworkers Association. Laurie Short of the FIA and Walter Argall President of the CBOA appeared in the Commonwealth Court of Conciliation and Arbitration on the same day in 1949 and both secured their positions from challenges from the left. The CBOA succeeded also before the Arbitration Commission in securing the first post-war white collar wage increase for bank staff, ahead of the Commonwealth Public Service. Argall remained the patron of the CBOA until his death in 1987.

References

Commonwealth Bank
Finance sector trade unions
Defunct trade unions of Australia
Trade unions established in 1930
Organizations disestablished in 1993